The Wovwe Hydroelectric Power Station, also Wovwe Power Station, is a hydroelectric power plant on the Wovwe River in  Malawi.

Location

The geographical coordinates of Wovwe Hydroelectric Power Station are: 10°28'18.0"S, 34°10'20.0"E (Latitude:-10.471667; Longitude:34.172222).

Overview
This power station was a donation from the government of Germany. It comprises three power-generation machines of 1.35 megawatts. Wovwe Power Station can be operated on-grid and/or off-grid.

See also

 List of power stations in Malawi
 List of power stations in Africa

References

External links
Energy supply in Malawi: Options and issues As of May 2015.

Energy infrastructure completed in 1995
Hydroelectric power stations in Malawi
1995 establishments in Malawi